Pure Classics is a 2002 album by violinist David Garrett, published in Germany by Deutsche Grammophon and later made available in the US as David's international popularity grew. It is a kind of "best of" collection that combines many of his previous classical violin recordings into a single album. The following composers are represented:

 Wolfgang Amadeus Mozart
 Johann Sebastian Bach
 Ludwig van Beethoven
 Niccolò Paganini
 Julius Conus
 Pyotr Ilyich Tchaikovsky

References 

David Garrett (musician) albums
2002 classical albums